Dora is a female name of Greek origin, being a shortened form or derived from Dorothea (Dorothy) and Theodora (masculine Theodore), meaning "gift" or in its full form "god's gift", from , doron, "gift" + , theos, "god". The name Dora can also be a short form of Isadora (Isidora).  Doreen, Dorian, and Dorinda are other examples of names from the same root form.

The masculine counterpart of the latter, i.e. Amphidoros, is also found: , a-pi-do-ro.

In Albanian, dora means "hand". In Russian, Dora can be a diminutive of the male first name Agafodor.

People
Dora Altmann (1881–1971), German actress
Dora Annie Dickens (1850–1851), infant daughter of English novelist Charles Dickens
Dora Anastasiou (born 1988), Cypriot beauty queen
Dora Bakoyannis (born 1954), Greek politician
Dora Barrancos (born 1940), Argentine academic and politician
Dora Beedham née Spong (1879 – 1969), British nurse and suffragette
Dora Bryan (1923–2014), British actress
Dora Carrington (1893–1932), British painter
Dora Gabe (1886–1983), Bulgarian Jewish poet
Dora Greenwell (1821–1882), English poet
Dora Hand (c. 1844–1878), American dance hall singer in Dodge City, Kansas
Dora d'Istria (1828–1888), Romanian-Albanian writer
Dora Herbert Jones (1890–1974), Welsh administrator and singer
Dora Kalaus (born 1996), Croatian handball player
Dora Krsnik (born 1992), Croatian handball player
Dora Kyriakou (born 1967), Cypriot sprinter
Dora Lewis (born 1862), American suffragist
Dora Maar (1907–1997), French model and photographer
Dora Mavor Moore (1888–1979), Canadian actress
Dora Montefiore (1851–1933), English-Australian suffragist, socialist
Dora Musielak, Mexican-American aerospace engineer, historian of mathematics, and book author
Dora Pavel (born 1946), Romanian novelist 
Dora Pejačević (1885–1923), Croatian composer
Dora Puelma  (1898-1972), Chilean artist
Dora Knowlton Ranous (1859–1916), American actress, author
Dora Rosetti (1908-1989), Greek doctor and writer
Dora Russell (1894–1986), British author
Dora Isella Russell (1925-1990) Uruguayan poet, journalist
Dora Adele Shoemaker (1873-1962), American educator, writer
Dora Stratou (1903–1988), Greek dancer and folklorist
Dora V. Wheelock (1847–1923), American activist and writer
Dora Carrington (1893-1932),  English painter and artist

Fictional characters
 Dora Marquez, title character of Dora the Explorer
 Dora Spenlow, a character in David Copperfield
 "Dora the Female Explorer", a song by British band Stackridge from their debut album Stackridge
 Dora Winifred "D.W." Read, character in the Arthur book and television series
 Dora Orefice, character in the Life Is Beautiful movie

See also
Dora (disambiguation)
 Doreen (given name)

References

Notes

Sources
А. В. Суперанская (A. V. Superanskaya). "Современный словарь личных имён: Сравнение. Происхождение. Написание" (Modern Dictionary of First Names: Comparison. Origins. Spelling). Айрис-пресс. Москва, 2005. 

Given names of Greek language origin
English feminine given names
Greek feminine given names
Italian feminine given names
Spanish feminine given names
Romanian feminine given names
Serbian feminine given names
Slovene feminine given names
Croatian feminine given names
Czech feminine given names
Slovak feminine given names
German feminine given names
Dutch feminine given names
Norwegian feminine given names
Swedish feminine given names
Danish feminine given names
